is a Japanese chemical, pharmaceutical and information technology company. Its main fields of operation are high-performance fibers such as aramid, carbon fibers & composites, healthcare, films, resin & plastic processing, polyester fibers, products converting and IT products.

The company is listed on the first section of the Tokyo Stock Exchange and is a constituent of the Nikkei 225 stock index.

As of March 2014, the Teijin Group comprises 151 companies, 56 in Japan and 95 overseas.

Teijin is a member of the Mitsubishi UFJ Financial Group (MUFJ) keiretsu.

Business segments and products
 Advanced Fibers & Composites Business
 Aramid fibers
 High-performance polyethylene
 High-performance polyester fibers
 PEN fibers
 Artificial leather
 Carbon fiber reinforced composites
 Flame-resistant fibers
 Electric Materials & Performance Polymer Products Business
 Polycarbonate resin
 PEN resin
 PET film
 PEN film
 Processed film
 Healthcare Business
 Pharmaceuticals in the treatment of bone and joint disease, respiratory disease and cardiovascular and metabolic disease
 IT Business
 IT services in the healthcare field
 Total web-based enterprise resource planning (ERP)
 Digital content management services
 Content distribution services for mobile phones and smartphones (electronic books, music)
 E-commerce services
 Products Converting Business
 Sales and trading of fibrous raw material, apparel, industrial materials and performance polymer products
 Polyester/Recycled polyester fibers/textiles
 Closed-loop recycling of polyester products

Gallery

See also
 Polycarbonate
 Tenax - carbon fiber
 Teijin Aramid
 Technora
 Twaron
 Aramid
 Teijin S.C., former football (soccer) club based in Matsuyama, Ehime Prefecture

References

External links

 Teijin Limited 
 Teijin Group network  
 Teijin Group business 

Japanese companies established in 1918
Chemical companies of Japan
Pharmaceutical companies of Japan
Defense companies of Japan
Information technology companies of Japan
ERP software companies
Manufacturing companies based in Osaka
Companies listed on the Tokyo Stock Exchange
Conglomerate companies established in 1918
Multinational companies headquartered in Japan
Japanese brands
Midori-kai
Chemical companies established in 1918